is a Japanese race car driver.

Career

Katsuyuki began karting in 1995 when he was 14, and in 2002 moved to the All-Japan Formula Three Championship, as a member of the TOM'S team. In 2002, he achieved one fastest lap and came fifth in one race. Between 2003 and 2004 Katsuyuki raced for Prema Powerteam in the Formula 3 Euro Series. He then returned to Japan and took part in the Super GT & Formula Nippon local series.

Racing record

Career summary

* Season still in progress.
† – As Hiranaka was a guest driver, he was ineligible for points.

‡ Team standings.

Complete Formula 3 Euro Series results
(key)

External links
 Katsuyuki Hiranaka Official Website 
 Career statistics from driverdb.com

Living people
1981 births
Japanese racing drivers
Formula Nippon drivers
Super GT drivers
Formula 3 Euro Series drivers
Japanese Formula 3 Championship drivers
Asian Le Mans Series drivers
TOM'S drivers
Prema Powerteam drivers
British Formula Three Championship drivers
FIA World Endurance Championship drivers
Dandelion Racing drivers
Nakajima Racing drivers
KCMG drivers
Toyota Gazoo Racing drivers